In a New World of Time is a 1986 album by rock band Adam Again, released on Blue Collar Records. It is the first release by a band that would become a staple in Christian alternative rock. The cover art was done by folk artist Howard Finster.

Track listing
All songs composed by Gene Eugene.

Side one
 "Life in the First Degree" - 3:28
 "She's Run" - 3:20
 "Your Line Is Busy" - 3:27
 "You Can Fall in Love" - 5:46
 "In a New World of Time" - 3:51

Side two
 "Walk Away" - 3:41
 "Miracles" - 4:42
 "Morning Song" - 3:47
 "(God Can) Change The World" - 3:27
 "Reason with Me" - 4:14

Personnel 
Adam Again
 Riki Michele – vocals
 Gene Eugene – keyboards, guitars, vocals 
 Greg Lawless – guitars
 Paul Valadez – bass 
with:
 Smitty Price – keyboards 
 Marky Schrock – guitar solo (2, 8)
 Ron Chase – percussion 
 Kurt Rasmussen – percussion 
 Dan Michaels – saxophones, Lyricon

Production
 Gene Eugene – producer
 Wally Grant – producer, recording
 Howard Finster – cover painting

References

Adam Again albums
1986 debut albums